Harry Hickox (October 22, 1910 – June 3, 1994) was an American character actor.

Career
Hickox began his career as a musician, playing guitar with jazz bands, including that of Jack Teagarden. One of his early theatrical ventures was acting in Idiot's Delight in a little theater in Albuquerque, New Mexico. He married a member of that cast. The couple created Jump Jump of Holiday House, a children's program on radio and television that won awards for excellence. He also produced a TV show about jazz.

In the early 1960s, Hickox portrayed Harold Hill in a touring company of The Music Man. He also played Charlie Cowell in the 1962 film adaptation.

Death
He died on June 3, 1994, in Los Angeles, California at age 83.

Filmography

References

External links
 

1910 births
1994 deaths
20th-century American male actors
American male film actors